Yucca thompsoniana, the Thompson's yucca, is a  plant in the family Asparagaceae, native to Texas, Chihuahua and Coahuila. Other names for the plant include Beaked yucca, Soyate and Palmita.

Yucca thompsoniana has a trunk up to 1 m tall, branching above the ground. It flowers before there is any trunk at all, but continues to flower after the stem begins to grow. Leaves are narrow and dagger-like, a bit glaucous, up to 35 cm long and 10 mm wide. Inflorescence is a panicle about 100 cm high. Flowers are white, about 4 cm long and appear in late March through early May. Fruit is a dry, egg-shaped capsule.

The plant was first collected in Chihuahua by John Bigelow in 1852 and was described by William Trelease in 1911.

References

thompsoniana
Plants described in 1912
Flora of Texas
Flora of Mexico
Flora of Chihuahua (state)
Flora of Coahuila
Taxa named by William Trelease